Edgar Boulet (born 22 August 1995 in Bergerac) is a French artistic gymnast.

Career 
Edgar Boulet won a bronze in the senior team event at the 2018 European Men's Artistic Gymnastics Championships.

References

Living people
1995 births
French male artistic gymnasts
21st-century French people
Mediterranean Games bronze medalists for France
Mediterranean Games medalists in gymnastics
Gymnasts at the 2022 Mediterranean Games